Chalcosyrphus minor is a species of hoverfly in the family Syrphidae.

Distribution
Bolivia.

References

Eristalinae
Insects described in 1926
Diptera of South America
Taxa named by Raymond Corbett Shannon